American comics may refer to:

History of American comics
American comic book